Pusiola tinaeella is a moth in the subfamily Arctiinae. It was described by Sergius G. Kiriakoff in 1958. It is found in the Democratic Republic of the Congo, Kenya and Uganda.

References

Moths described in 1958
Lithosiini
Moths of Africa